Arhodomonas is a genus of gram-negative bacteria. Arhodomonas species are rod-shaped bacteria, approximately 1 micrometer wide and 2.5 micrometers long. They use a single flagellum at one end of the cell to move. Metabolically, Arhodomonas species are pure chemotrophs, and can grow on various simple organic compounds but not on most carbohydrates.

References

Chromatiales